The 2022 West Asian Football Federation Women's Championship, or simply 2022 WAFF Women's Championship, was the 7th edition of the WAFF Women's Championship, the international women's football championship of Western Asia organised by the West Asian Football Federation (WAFF). It was held in Amman, Jordan from 29 August to 4 September 2022.

Hosts Jordan won their fifth title – and third in a row – after finishing top of their group with three wins in three games. Lebanon finished second, winning two, while Syria and Palestine finished third and fourth respectively, with one draw and two defeats each.

Teams

Participants 
Five teams from the West Asian Football Federation (WAFF) entered the tournament; the official draw took place at the WAFF headquarters in Amman, Jordan on 15 August 2022. The United Arab Emirates were due to compete, but withdrew prior to the start of the competition.

Squads 

Each team had to register a squad of 23 players, minimum three of whom must be goalkeepers.

Group stage

Statistics

Goalscorers

Awards
The following awards were given at the conclusion of the tournament.

See also
 2022 AFC Women's Asian Cup
 2022 AFF Women's Championship
 2022 CAFA Women's Championship
 2022 EAFF E-1 Football Championship (women)
 2022 SAFF Women's Championship

References

External links
 Official website
 2022 WAFF Women's Championship at RSSSF
 2022 WAFF Women's Championship at Soccerway

 
2019
WAFF
WAFF
WAFF
International association football competitions hosted by Jordan
WAFF